Nikolay Yuryevich Boyarintsev (born 16 April 1988) is a Russian former professional association football player.

Club career
He made his Russian Football National League debut for FC Chernomorets Novorossiysk on 27 March 2008 in a game against FC Chernomorets Novorossiysk. He played in the FNL in 2009 for Chernomorets as well.

External links
 

1988 births
Sportspeople from Nizhny Novgorod
Living people
Russian footballers
Association football forwards
FC Chernomorets Novorossiysk players
FC Taganrog players
FC Armavir players
FC Neftekhimik Nizhnekamsk players
FC Oryol players
FC Nizhny Novgorod (2007) players
FC Chayka Peschanokopskoye players